Clinton Blane Burrell (born September 4, 1956) is a former professional American football defensive back in the National Football League (NFL). He played six seasons for the Cleveland Browns. Burrell attended Louisiana State University prior to being selected by the Browns in the 1979 NFL Draft. He attended Franklin Senior High School in Franklin, Louisiana.

References

1956 births
Living people
People from Franklin, Louisiana
Players of American football from Louisiana
American football defensive backs
LSU Tigers football players
Cleveland Browns players